The Executive Council of Newfoundland and Labrador (in French: le Conseil exécutif de Terre-Neuve-et-Labrador, but informally and more commonly, the Cabinet of Newfoundland and Labrador, and in French: le Cabinet de Terre-Neuve-et-Labrador) is the cabinet headed by the lieutenant governor and composed of the ministers in office. The Executive Council is composed only of ministers in office, and is the official body by which Cabinet's constitutional advice is given to the lieutenant governor.

The Executive Council is thus similar in structure and role to the federal King's Privy Council for Canada, though smaller in size, and, whereas the federal cabinet is a committee of the King's Privy Council, the Executive Council of Newfoundland and Labrador and Cabinet of Newfoundland and Labrador are one and the same.  Also, unlike the King's Privy Council, members of the Executive Council of Newfoundland and Labrador are not appointed for life, and are not entitled to post-nominal letters due to their position.

The Lieutenant-Governor of Newfoundland and Labrador, as representative of the King in Right of Newfoundland and Labrador, heads the council, and is referred to as the Governor-in-Council. Most cabinet ministers are the head of a ministry, but this is not always the case. The Lieutenant Governor, advised by the Premier, determines which portfolios will be created. Ministers organize their department and  present legislation for the new ministry if none exists. Other members of the Cabinet, who advise, or minister, the vice-regal, are selected by the Premier of Newfoundland and Labrador and appointed by the Lieutenant-Governor.

The Executive Council has offices and meetings at Confederation Building East Block.

Current Cabinet
Members are listed in order of precedence. The Table of Precedence prescribes that order of precedence within this group be determined in order of appointment to Executive Council with ties broken by order of election to the House of Assembly.

References